Most executive governments in the world are divided into departments or ministries. In most such cases, there is a department or ministry responsible for health.

A
  Ministry of Public Health (Afghanistan)
  Ministry of Health and Social Protection (Albania)
  Ministry of Health, Population and Hospital Reform (Algeria)
  Ministry of Health and the Environment (Antigua and Barbuda)
  Barbuda's Public Health Department
  Ministry of Health (Argentina)
  Ministry of Health (Armenia)
  Department of Health and Aged Care (Australia)
  Ministry of Health (New South Wales), known as NSW Health
  Department of Health & Human Services (Victoria)
 Department of Health (Western Australia)
  Ministry of Social Affairs, Health, Care and Consumer Protection (Austria)
  Ministry of Healthcare (Azerbaijan)

B

  Ministry of Health and Family Welfare (Bangladesh)
  Ministry of Health (The Bahamas) 
  Ministry of Health (Bahrain) 
  Federal Public Service Health (Belgium)
  Department of Welfare, Public Health and Family (Flanders)
  Ministry of Health (Bhutan)
  Ministry of Health and Wellness (Botswana)
  Ministry of Health (Brazil) (Ministério da Saúde)
  Ministry of Health (Brunei) (Kementerian Kesihatan)

C 

  Ministry of Health (Cambodia)
  Health Canada
  Ministry of Health (Alberta)
  Ministry of Health (British Columbia)
  Department of Health (New Brunswick)
  Ministry of Health (Ontario)
  Ministry of Health and Social Services (Quebec)
  Ministry of Health (Saskatchewan)
  Ministry of Health (Chile) (Ministerio de Salud de Chile) and Fondo Nacional de Salud (FONASA)
  National Health Commission
  Ministry of Health and Social Protection (Colombia)
  Ministry of Public Health (Democratic Republic of the Congo)
  Costa Rican Social Security Fund
  Ministry of Health and the Fight against AIDS (Côte d'Ivoire)
  Ministry of Health (Croatia)
  Ministry of Health (Cyprus)
  Ministry of Health (Czech Republic)

D

  Ministry of Health (Denmark)

E
  Ministry of Health (East Timor)
  Ministry of Health and Population (Egypt)
  Ministry of Health (Ethiopia)

F
  Ministry of Health and Medical Services (Fiji)
  Ministry of Social Affairs and Health (Finland)
  Ministry for Solidarity and Health (France)

G
  Ministry of Health, Labour and Social Affairs of Georgia
  Federal Ministry of Health (Germany)
  Ministry of Health (Ghana)
  Ministry of Health (Greece)
  Ministry of Health (Guinea)
 Ministry of Public Health (Guinea-Bissau)

H
 Ministry of Health (Haiti)
  Food and Health Bureau 
 Department of Health (Hong Kong)

I

  Ministry of Welfare (Iceland)
  Ministry of Health and Family Welfare (India)
 Ministry of Public Health (Maharashtra)
 Department of Health and Family Welfare (Tamil Nadu)
 Ministry of Health & Family Welfare (Tripura)
 Ministry of Health & Family Welfare (West Bengal) 
  Ministry of Health (Indonesia) (Kementerian Kesehatan)
  Ministry of Health and Medical Education (Iran)
  Ministry of Health (Iraq)
  Department of Health (Ireland)
  Ministry of Health (Israel)
  Ministry of Health (Italy)

J
  Ministry of Health, Labour and Welfare, Japan
  Ministry of Health (Jordan)

K
  Ministry of Healthcare (Kazakhstan)
  Ministry of Health (Kenya)
  Ministry of Health and Medical Services (Kiribati)
  Ministry of Health (Kuwait)

L
 Ministry of Health (Laos)
 Ministry of Public Health (Lebanon)
  Ministry of Health and Social Welfare, Liberia
  Ministry of Health (Lithuania)

M
  Secretariat for Social Affairs and Culture (Macau)
  Ministry of Public Health and Hygiene (Mali)
  Ministry for Health (Malta)
  Secretariat of Health (Mexico)
  Ministry of Health (Malaysia)
  Ministry of Health (Moldova)
  Ministry of Health (Montenegro)
  Ministry of Health (Morocco)
  Ministry of Health (Myanmar)

N
  Ministry of Health and Population (Nepal)
  Ministry of Health, Welfare and Sport (Netherlands)
  Ministry of Health (New Zealand)
  Federal Ministry of Health (Nigeria)
 Akwa Ibom State Ministry of Health
 Lagos State Ministry of Health
 Rivers State Ministry of Health
 Ministry of Public Health (North Korea)
  Ministry of Health and Care Services (Norway)

O

P
  Ministry of National Health Services, Regulation and Coordination (Pakistan)
 Sindh Health Department
  Ministry of Health, Palestine
  Ministry of Health (Panama)
  National Department of Health of Papua New Guinea
  Ministry of Health (Peru)
  Department of Health (Philippines)
 Ministry of Health (Bangsamoro)
  Ministry of Health (Poland)
  Ministry of Health (Portugal)

Q

R
  Ministry of Health (Romania)
  Ministry of Health (Russia)
  Ministry of Health (Bashkortostan)
  Ministry of Health (Rwanda)

S
  Ministry of Health (Saudi Arabia)
  Ministry of Health (Serbia)
  Ministry of Health and Sanitation (Sierra Leone)
  Ministry of Health (Singapore)
  Ministry of Health and Medical Services (Solomon Islands)
  Ministry of Health (Somalia)
  Ministry of Health (Somaliland)
  Department of Health (South Africa)
 Western Cape Department of Health
  Ministry of Health and Welfare (South Korea)
  Ministry of Health (South Sudan)
  Ministry of Health (Spain)
  Department of Health (Basque Country)
  Ministry of Health (Sri Lanka)
  Ministry of Health and Social Affairs (Sweden)
  Ministry of Health (Syria)

T
  Ministry of Health and Welfare (Taiwan)
  Ministry of Health (Tajikistan)
  Ministry of Health and Social Welfare (Tanzania)
  Ministry of Public Health (Thailand)
  Ministry of Health (Trinidad and Tobago)
  Ministry of Health (Turkey)
  Ministry of Health (Turkmenistan)

U
  Ministry of Health (Uganda)
  Ministry of Healthcare (Ukraine)
  Ministry of Health (United Arab Emirates)
  Department of Health (Abu Dhabi)
  Dubai Health Authority
  United Kingdom
  Department of Health and Social Care covers England and any undevolved matters
  Department of Health (Northern Ireland) (Northern Ireland)
  Health and Social Care Directorates (Scotland)
  Department of Health and Social Services (Wales)
  United States Department of Health and Human Services (All U.S. states and territories have a state health agency.)
  Alabama Department of Public Health
  Alaska Department of Health and Social Services
  Arizona Department of Health Services
  Arkansas Department of Health
  California Department of Public Health
  Florida Department of Health
  Hawaii Department of Health
  Illinois Department of Public Health and Illinois Department of Healthcare and Family Services
  Louisiana Department of Health and Hospitals
  Maryland Department of Health and Mental Hygiene
  Massachusetts Department of Public Health
  Michigan Department of Health and Human Services
  Nebraska Department of Health & Human Services
  Nevada Department of Health and Human Services
  New Hampshire Department of Health & Human Services
  New Jersey Department of Health and Senior Services
  New Mexico Department of Health
  New York State Department of Health
  North Carolina Department of Health and Human Services
  Oklahoma State Department of Health
  Oregon Health Authority
  Pennsylvania Department of Health
  Rhode Island Department of Health
  South Carolina Department of Health and Environmental Control
  Texas Department of State Health Services
  Utah Department of Health
  Virginia Department of Health
  Washington State Department of Health
  Wisconsin Department of Health Services
  Wyoming Department of Health
  Puerto Rico Department of Health (U.S. territory)
 Ministry of Public Health (Uruguay)
 Ministry of Public Health (Uzbekistan)

V
  Ministry of Health (Vietnam)

W

X

Y
  Ministry of Public Health and Population

Z
  Ministry of Health (Zambia)
  Ministry of Health and Child Welfare (Zimbabwe)

Former health ministries or departments
  Ministry of Health of the People's Republic of China
  Ministry of Social Protection (Colombia)
  Ministry of Interior and Health (Denmark)
  Ministry of Health (Rhodesia)
  Ministry of Health (Soviet Union)

International bodies
  World Health Organization

See also
 Health department
 List of national public health agencies
 State health agency

References

 
Lists of government ministries
Lists of medical and health organizations